Gerard "Gerry" J. Helme (4 April 1923 – 19 December 1981) was an English professional rugby league footballer who played in the 1940s and 1950s, and coached. Helme played almost all of his club career for Warrington, with whom he won three Championship Finals and two Challenge Cup Finals and became a Warrington Wolves Hall of Fame inductee.

Background

Helme's birth was registered in Leigh, Lancashire, he was a pupil of St. Joseph’s school, Leigh, and he died aged 58.

Playing career

Helme made his début for Warrington on Wednesday 29 August 1945. Helme played  in Warrington's 15-5 victory over Bradford Northern in the 1947-48 Championship Final at Maine Road, Manchester. Helme played  in Warrington's 8-14 defeat by Wigan in the 1948–49 Lancashire Cup Final at Station Road, Swinton on Saturday 13 November 1948, Helme played  in Warrington's 19-0 victory over Widnes in the 1949–50 Challenge Cup Final at Wembley Stadium, London on Saturday 6 May 1950, in front of a crowd of 94,249. He played  in Warrington's 5-28 defeat by Wigan in the 1950–51 Lancashire Cup Final at Station Road, Swinton on Saturday 4 November 1950.

Helme represented Combined Nationalities in the 15-19 defeat by France at Stade de Gerland, Lyon on Sunday 3 January 1954. Helme played  in the 4-4 draw with Halifax in the 1953–54 Challenge Cup Final at Wembley Stadium, London on Saturday 24 April 1954, in front of a crowd of 81,841, and played  in the 8-4 victory over Halifax in the 1953–54 Challenge Cup Final replay at Odsal Stadium, Bradford on Wednesday 5 May 1954, in front of a record crowd of 102,575 or more. Helme became the first player to win the Lance Todd Trophy twice, his first coming in the victory over Widnes in the 1949–50 Challenge Cup Final, and his second coming in the victory over Haliax in the 1953–54 Challenge Cup Final replay.

Helme won caps for England while at Warrington in 1948 against Wales, France, in 1949 against Wales, France, in 1953 against France, and won caps for Great Britain while at Warrington in 1948 against Australia (3 matches), in 1954 against Australia (3 matches), New Zealand (2 matches), in the 1954 Rugby League World Cup against France (2 matches), Australia, New Zealand. He also helped Great Britain to victory by scoring the match-winning try in the first ever World Cup Final in 1954.

Helme played his last match for Warrington on Saturday 2 February 1957 (Heritage № 457).

Post-playing
After retiring from playing, Gerry Helme had coaching roles with Leigh and Oldham.  In 1981 he died at the age of 58.

References

External links
(archived by web.archive.org) Gerry Helme at warringtonwolves.org
(archived by archive.is) U.K. League hooker in Doubt
Warrington's World Cup heroes - Gerry Helme

1923 births
1981 deaths
Combined Nationalities rugby league team players
England national rugby league team players
English rugby league coaches
English rugby league players
Great Britain national rugby league team players
Lancashire rugby league team players
Lance Todd Trophy winners
Leigh Leopards coaches
Oldham R.L.F.C. coaches
Rugby league halfbacks
Rugby league players from Leigh, Greater Manchester
Warrington Wolves players